Chapel Hill is a hill, 140 m, forming the summit of a headland 1.5 nautical miles (2.8 km) west-southwest of Church Point, on the south coast of Trinity Peninsula. Charted by the Falkland Islands Dependencies Survey (FIDS) in 1946, who so named it because of its proximity to Church Point.

Geography of Antarctica